Ohn is a Burmese name, used by people from Myanmar. Notable people with the name include:

 Daw Ohn (1913–2003), Burmese professor in Pali
 Ohn Gyaw (born 1932), Burmese Minister of Foreign Affairs from 1991 to 1998
 Ohn Kyaing (born 1944), Burmese politician and former political prisoner
 Ohn Kyaw Myint (born 1977), Burmese army officer
 Ohn Maung (1913–1947), Burmese Deputy Minister of Transport from 1946 to 1947
 Ohn Myint (1918–2010), Burmese journalist
 Ohn Myint (politician) ( 2010–2016), Burmese Minister for Livestock, Fisheries and Rural Development from 2011 to 2016
 Ohn Pe (c. 1917–2008), Burmese businessman 
 Ohn Than (born 1946), Burmese democracy activist
 Maung Maung Ohn ( 2014–2016), Burmese Chief Minister of Rakhine State, Myanmar from 2014 to 2016
 Shwe Ohn (1923–2010), Burmese politician

See also
 John (disambiguation)
 Ohm (disambiguation)